Oppeid or Oppeide is the administrative centre of Hamarøy Municipality in Nordland county, Norway. It is located right next to the village of Presteid on a small isthmus of land between the Kaldvågfjorden and the Presteidfjorden. The village is home to the Knut Hamsun videregående skole (upper secondary school), a museum, and cafe.

References

Hamarøy
Villages in Nordland
Populated places of Arctic Norway